The Cypriot ambassador in Washington, D. C. is the official representative of the Government in Nicosia to the Government of the United States.

List of representatives

Cyprus–United States relations

References 

 
Cyprus
United States